Gardinier is a surname. Notable people with the surname include:

 Cornelius Gardinier (1809–1892), American politician
 Estella Gardinier, a character in the U.S. TV series The Bachelor
 Suzanne Gardinier (born 1961), American poet

See also
 Gardiner (surname)
 Gardner (surname)